Sayed Maqsood Hashemi is an Afghan footballer who currently plays for Ordu Kabul F.C. football club in Afghanistan. He is also a player for the Afghanistan national football team; he has 2 goals. He wears number 6 and plays defensive midfielder position.

External links

Afghan footballers
1984 births
Living people
Afghanistan international footballers
Association football midfielders
Footballers at the 2002 Asian Games
Asian Games competitors for Afghanistan